Fisherville is an unincorporated community lying between the jurisdiction of Fayette and Shelby County, Tennessee, United States. Fisherville is located between Eads and Collierville, about 30 miles east of downtown Memphis. The zip code for the area is 38028.

Annexation
Much of Fisherville lies in either the Collierville annexation reserve or the Memphis annexation reserve, meaning that it shall be annexed at some point. Property north of Raleigh-Lagrange Road and south of Herb Parsons Lake has been annexed by the City of Piperton.

Education
Fisherville is serviced by Shelby County Schools. The private Evangelical Christian School maintains a campus in Fisherville.

Notable people
William A. Feilds, 19th-century African-American ex-slave: Tennessee legislator, teacher and principal
Faye Throneberry, Major League Baseball player
Marv Throneberry, Major League Baseball player

References 

Unincorporated communities in Tennessee
Unincorporated communities in Shelby County, Tennessee
Geography of Memphis, Tennessee